Saint-Charles-de-Bourget is a municipality in Quebec, Canada.

References

Municipalities in Quebec
Incorporated places in Saguenay–Lac-Saint-Jean